Crazy to Act is a 1927 American silent comedy film featuring Oliver Hardy.

Cast
 Matty Kemp as Arthur Young
 Mildred June as Ethel St. John
 Oliver Hardy as Gordon Bagley
 Sunshine Hart as Mrs. St. John
 Jack Cooper as The movie heavy

See also
 List of American films of 1927

External links

1927 films
American silent short films
American black-and-white films
1927 comedy films
1927 short films
Silent American comedy films
American comedy short films
1920s American films